Marina Shmayankova (born 15 January 1993) is a Belarusian professional racing cyclist, who currently rides for UCI Women's Continental Team . She rode at the 2015 UCI Track Cycling World Championships.

Major results
2014
2nd Scratch, Grand Prix Minsk
2nd  Team Pursuit, UEC European Under-23 Track Championships (with Volha Masiukovich, Palina Pivavarava and Ina Savenka)
2015
UEC European Under-23 Track Championships
1st Team Pursuit (with Katsiaryna Piatrouskaya, Palina Pivavarava and Ina Savenka)
3rd  Scratch Race
3rd  Team Pursuit, UEC European Track Championships (with Katsiaryna Piatrouskaya, Palina Pivavarava and Ina Savenka)
3rd Scratch Race, Grand Prix Minsk

References

External links

1993 births
Living people
Belarusian female cyclists
Place of birth missing (living people)